Behtash Misaghian (born 2 March 1988) is an Iranian football defender who plays for Shahr Khodro F.C. in the Iran Pro League.

Club career statistics

References

External links
 Behtash Misaghian at IranLeague.ir
 Behtash Misaghian at Soccerway.com

Living people
Iranian footballers
1988 births
Aluminium Hormozgan F.C. players
Shahr Khodro F.C. players
Sanat Mes Kerman F.C. players
Siah Jamegan players
Naft Masjed Soleyman F.C. players
Association football fullbacks